Drippin (stylized in all caps) is a South Korean boy band formed by Woollim Entertainment in 2020. The group made their debut on October 28, 2020, with the EP Boyager.

Career

Pre-debut
Prior to debut, all of the members except for Alex competed in the competition reality show Produce X 101, with Cha Jun-ho finishing ninth in the program and thus becoming a member of the project group X1. The remaining members with an additional trainee named Lee Sung-jun (now a part of the group Blank2y) released the single "1M1S" under the name W Project 4. The single charted at number 81 on Billboards K-pop Hot 100.

2020–2021: Debut and subsequent releases
In September 2020, Woollim Entertainment announced the debut of a new boy group that would be composed of seven members called Drippin. They participated in a reality program, released through KT's Seezn, We are Drippin, documenting the process leading up to their debut. The group debuted on October 28 with the extended play Boyager, a combination of the word "boy" and "voyager", after the Voyager program.

On March 16, 2021, the group released their second EP, A Better Tomorrow, and it's title track "Young Blood".

On June 29, 2021, the group released their first single album, Free Pass, and it's title track of the same name.

On November 11, 2021, Drippin released the promotional single "Vertigo" through Universe Music for the mobile application, Universe.

2022–present: Villain, Japanese debut and Villain: Zero
On January 17, 2022, Drippin released their third EP, Villain, and it's title track of the same name.

On May 18, 2022, Drippin made their Japanese debut with the single "So Good".

On June 15, 2022, Drippin released their second single album, Villain: Zero, and it's title track "Zero".

Drippin were originally scheduled to release their first studio album Villain: The End on November 1, but on October 30, Woollim Entertainment announced the postponement of the album due to the national mourning period following the Seoul Halloween crowd crush incident on the 29th.

On January 26, 2023, Woollim announced that Alex's activities would be temporarily suspended due to his health.

Members
Adapted from the official website:
Yunseong (윤성) – leader, vocal, main dancer
Hyeop (협) – main vocal
Changuk (창욱) – vocal
Dongyun (동윤) – main rapper
Minseo (민서) – vocal
Junho (준호) – vocal
Alex (알렉스) – vocal, rapper

Discography

Studio albums

Extended plays

Single albums

Singles

Videography

Music videos

Filmography

Reality shows

Variety shows

Awards and nominations

Notes

References

K-pop music groups
South Korean boy bands
South Korean dance music groups
Musical groups from Seoul
Musical groups established in 2020
2020 establishments in South Korea
South Korean pop music groups
Woollim Entertainment artists
Universal Music Japan artists